This is a list of public art in Dundee, Scotland. This list applies only to works of public art on permanent display in an outdoor public space and does not, for example, include artworks in museums.

References

Dundee
Public art
Outdoor sculptures in Scotland
Statues in Scotland